Hebden Bridge railway station serves the town of Hebden Bridge in West Yorkshire, England. The station is on the Calder Valley Line, operated by Northern since April 2016, from York and Leeds towards Manchester Victoria and Preston.

History

The section between Hebden Bridge and Summit Tunnel opened on 31 December 1840, allowing trains to reach ; after Summit Tunnel opened on 1 March 1841, trains continued to Littleborough and Manchester. An 1841 timetable shows five Manchester to Leeds trains per day calling at Hebden Bridge (two on Sundays), all but one of which called at all stations; a similar service ran in the opposite direction. Trains began operating to Halifax and Bradford in 1852, and could run through to Leeds via this route from 1854.

The current buildings date from 1893, construction having started in 1891. By this point there was a goods yard alongside the station. This closed in 1966 and the site is now the station car park. In 1997 the station was renovated, and signage in the original Lancashire and Yorkshire Railway style was installed.

On 21 June 1912 a train derailed nearby, killing four people and injuring many others. The official inquiry found that the train was running too fast on the Charlestown Curve, a tight curve near the station.

Facilities
The station has a staffed ticket office, waiting rooms, toilets and a cafe. New lifts have been installed to make both platforms fully accessible (commissioned in March 2019), and Information screens were installed in 2012 as part of a programme to provide screens at 18 stations on the Calder Valley Line and elsewhere in West Yorkshire. Previously, passengers had to rely on automated public-address system announcements.

Services

The station is the only station on the Calder Valley Line where every service calls. In the late evening, the service drops to half-hourly, all via Bradford.

From November 2013 to late March 2014 the line to Burnley was closed for major repair work on Holme Tunnel. A replacement bus service ran, and trains from York terminated/started at Hebden Bridge.

Future improvements

The station will see a variety of improvements to facilities and train services from March 2017 onwards, as part of an investment package for the Calder Valley line as a whole. Track and signalling upgrades have helped reduce journey times in both directions and allow more trains to run to/from Bradford. The remaining improvements have since been indefinitely postponed because of capacity problems in central Manchester, though new  rolling stock (in the form of Class 195 Civity DMUs) has started to appear on some routes.

See also
Listed buildings in Hebden Royd

References

External links

 Friends of Hebden Bridge Station - voluntary group which tidies the station environs, plants flowers, etc.

Railway stations in Calderdale
DfT Category E stations
Former Lancashire and Yorkshire Railway stations
Railway stations in Great Britain opened in 1840
Northern franchise railway stations
Grade II listed railway stations
Hebden Bridge